Kabirpur also known as Rohura is a village in Zamania tehsil of Ghazipur District Uttar Pradesh, India. It was a part of Dewaitha but later was made another village in 1953. Kabirpur was established by Raja Kabir Khan (second son of Raja Daud Khan founder of Dewaitha).

Histrorical population

References

1650 establishments in Asia
Villages in Ghazipur district